There are several non-governmental organizations that operate in Ratanakiri Province, Cambodia.

References

Ratanakiri province
Foreign charities operating in Cambodia